NGC 5470 is an edge-on spiral galaxy located between 43 and 68 million light-years away in the constellation Virgo. It was discovered by astronomer John Herschel in 1830. It is a member of the Virgo III Groups, a series of galaxies and galaxy clusters strung out to the east of the Virgo Supercluster of galaxies.

See also
 List of NGC objects (5001–6000)
 New General Catalogue

References 

5470
Virgo (constellation)
Spiral galaxies